Forest Glen is one of two Metra commuter railroad stations in the Forest Glen section of Chicago, Illinois, along the Milwaukee District North Line. In Metra's zone-based fare system, Forest Glen is in zone C. As of 2018, Forest Glen is the 126th busiest of Metra's 236 non-downtown stations, with an average of 376 weekday boardings.

As of December 12, 2022, Forest Glen is served by 40 trains (19 inbound, 21 outbound) on weekdays, by all 20 trains (10 in each direction) on Saturdays, and by all 18 trains (nine in each direction) on Sundays and holidays.

The station is little more than an open sheltered platform, and is located south of a Cook County Forest Preserve. On-street parking is available along Forest Glen Avenue and LeClaire Avenue between Elston Avenue and north of Balmoral Avenue. The main parking lot for the station is between Balmoral and Catalpa Avenues.

Bus connections
CTA Buses
  92 Foster (One block south at LeClaire and Foster)

References

External links

Station from Google Maps Street View

Forest Glen (Metra)
Former Chicago, Milwaukee, St. Paul and Pacific Railroad stations